Hope Island is an American drama series that originally aired on PAX TV from September 12, 1999, until April 3, 2000. It was based on Ballykissangel, a popular Irish drama that aired on BBC One.

The series ran for 22 episodes, and focused on the residents of the fictional Hope Island, a small island off mainland Washington State (likely a part of the San Juan Islands) with a population of 1,998.

Summary
Hope Island revolves around the residents of the island.

Daniel Cooper, a newly ordained minister, is called to the island to fix up and restart an old church that has been empty and neglected for 30 years. Upon arriving, Daniel finds the situation is not quite what he expected it to be, and he struggles knowing if he should stay or not. However, the quirky residents of the island quickly grow on him, and he soon becomes an invaluable member of the community.

With a large ensemble cast, Hope Island is full of quirky and lovable characters. There's Alex Stone, the cynical local Widow's Walk Restaurant/Inn owner, and her son Dylan, who attends the Hope Island Elementary School. Town mayor Brian Brewster always has some outlandish scheme up his sleeve, and his mysterious side-kick Nub Flanders is always there to help. Ruby and Bonita (the mother and daughter who own the general store), haven't spoken to each other in 17 years. Daughter of the mayor, Molly Brewster is a lifelong island native, and her boyfriend Kevin Mitchum is the islands only police officer (who rarely deals with anything worse than a missing autographed picture).  These are just a few of the many people on the island.

Cast
 Cameron Daddo as Rev. Daniel Cooper
 Suki Kaiser as Alex Stone
 Duncan Fraser as Brian Brewster
 Haig Sutherland as Nub Flanders
 Allison Hossack as Molly Brewster
 David Lewis as Kevin Mitchum
 Matthew Walker as Father Mac
 Beverley Elliot as Bonita Vasquez
 Gina Stockdale as Ruby Vasquez
 Brian Jenson as Boris Obolenski
 Max Peters as Dylan Stone
 Veena Sood as Callie Pender

Episodes

Awards
The "Young Artist Awards" nominated Hope Island for the following awards:

Best Family TV Drama Series
Best Performance in a TV Drama Series, Supporting Young Actor - Max Peters

The following episodes were recognized by "Prism Awards", (an organization that is "designed to recognize the accurate depiction of drug, alcohol, and tobacco use and addiction.")

"Ships that Pass in the Night" - received a Prism Commendation
"It Takes a Voyage to Learn" - received a Prism Certificate of Merit

References

External links
 

1990s American drama television series
2000s American drama television series
1999 American television series debuts
2000 American television series endings
American television series based on British television series
English-language television shows
PAX TV original programming
Television series by CBS Studios
Television series by Lionsgate Television
Television shows set in Washington (state)